Ilha Verde, also known by its Cantonese name Cing-zau and Mandarin name Qingzhou, is an area in the northwest of Macau Peninsula, Macau that forms part of the Our Lady Fatima Parish. It is a former island—known in English as Verde or Green Island—to the west of the Macau Isthmus. It was settled by Jesuits.

Ilha Verde was connected to the Macau Peninsula in 1895 when a causeway (now Avenida do Conselheiro Borja) was built. Since then reclamation projects around the island took place and now it is annexed to be a part of Macau Peninsula.

Colina da Ilha Verde is a hill comprising much of Ilha Verde. The government built barracks on the hill in 1865 and much of the island was of military area for decades, due to it being close to the Chinese border. The area used to be a crab-catching place but ceased to be upon the completion of the Ilha Verde cement factory in 1887.

Education

University of Saint Joseph has its main campus in Ilha Verde. It moved into this campus in September 2017.

See also
 Geography of Macau
 List of islands and peninsulas of Macau
 Other Verde Islands
 Other Green Islands

References

Macau Peninsula
Former Portuguese colonies
Former islands
Islands of Macau